C.I.D Police of FARAJA (Police Āgāhi) is a law enforcement agency in Iran responsible for criminal investigation.

References

External links 
 Iranian Criminal Investigation Department

Law Enforcement Command of Islamic Republic of Iran
Criminal investigation